The 1949–50 season was the 49th year of competitive football played by Southampton F.C., the club's 23rd season as members of the Football League, and their 21st competing in the Second Division. The Saints finished the campaign in fourth place in the league table, having gained 52 from a possible 84 points with 19 wins, 14 draws and nine losses – missing out on promotion only on goal average. The club also competed in the FA Cup, losing a third round replay against Northampton Town.

After narrowly missing out on promotion to the First Division during the previous season, Southampton looked to build on their squad with two big signings in the summer of 1949: winger Ernie Jones for £6,000 (plus Alf Ramsey) from Tottenham Hotspur, followed by Jack Edwards for £10,000 from Nottingham Forest. Ramsey made his long-touted move away from the club, who also sent Tommy Rudkin to Bristol City, Albie Roles to Gloucester City, George Horsfall to Southend United, and Bill Heaton (who had only joined in February) to Stalybridge Celtic. Bill Dodgin left the club as manager in July 1949 and was replaced by assistant Sid Cann. The new manager continued to sign players throughout the season, adding Bryn Elliott, Bill Molloy and Tom Lowder in October 1949, followed by right-back Alex Anderson, and inside-forwards Jimmy McGowan and Ernie Stevenson in early 1950 (the last of whom the Saints paid Cardiff City a "five-figure fee" for, as well as sending Wilf Grant to the club).

During the season, 25 players appeared for Southampton in all competitions. George Curtis, converted from winger to wing-half, featured in more games than any other player, being ever present in both the league and FA Cup with 44 appearances. Centre-forward Charlie Wayman finished as Southampton's top scorer with 24 goals in the league and two in the FA Cup. The club attracted an average home league attendance at The Dell of 23,895 – slightly less than the previous season. The highest league attendance was 30,240 against eventual Second Division champions Tottenham Hotspur on 8 October 1949; the lowest was 20,689 against Bury on 4 February 1950.

Second Division

Season summary
Southampton had a poor start to the 1949–50 season, losing their first three fixtures against Grimsby Town, Barnsley and Queens Park Rangers to find themselves at the bottom of the league table. Hard-fought victories over Preston North End (recently relegated from the First Division) and West Ham United gave the Saints their crucial first few points, as the new players began to settle in with their teammates. In the three months between mid-September and mid-December, the team went on an unbeaten run of 13 games to jump all the way from 19th to fourth in the table, picking up key wins in the process over fellow promotion-hopefuls Leeds United and recently promoted Hull City (the Saints' 5–0 victory was the club's biggest win of the season, and featured a hat-trick for Charlie Wayman), as well as hard-fought draws with championship contenders Tottenham Hotspur and Sheffield Wednesday. Going into the new year with two more wins, Southampton found themselves regularly occupying a top-five position in the league table.

After dropping to seventh in the table following two losses in January, Southampton picked up wins over Bury and Sheffield United in February to return to the top five, with mixed fortunes over their next few games seeing them climb and fall between fourth and sixth. After a joint-record season loss of 0–4 against leaders Tottenham, the Saints boosted their squad with the additions of forwards Jimmy McGowan and Ernie Stevenson, both of whom played central roles in the last run of fixtures. With their new recruits, Southampton saw an improved run of form, remaining unbeaten for their last nine games of the season. However, despite closely-fought wins over key promotion rivals including Hull City, Sheffield Wednesday and Sheffield United, the Saints were unable to obtain promotion and finished the season in fourth place – the final game of the season saw Wednesday secure the second promotion spot after drawing with league champions Tottenham due to their slightly higher goal average, with Sheffield United finishing in third after beating Hull 5–0.

Final league table

Results by matchday

Match reports

FA Cup
Northampton Town 
Southampton entered the 1949–50 FA Cup in the third round, drawn against Third Division South promotion contenders Northampton Town. In front of a record crowd of 23,209 at Northampton's County Ground, the visitors took the lead in the 18th minute against the run of play, when Augie Scott followed up from Eric Day's blocked shot to make it 1–0. In the next minute, however, the hosts equalised through Tommy McCulloch, who took advantage of a mistake by George Curtis to take possession and score with a low shot. Going into half-time, Southampton were reduced to ten men when Ernie Jones had to be taken off on a stretcher after breaking his ankle, while Ron Wheatley and Ted Bates played on with minor injuries. After the break, Northampton sought to take advantage of the reduced Saints (who also lost Eric Webber towards the end), coming close to going in front on numerous occasions but for the Southampton defence and the crossbar; ultimately, the game finished level, and a replay was scheduled.

Northampton Town replay 
With a depleted first team due to injuries, Southampton struggled to gain a hold on the home replay against Northampton, with the visiting Cobblers enjoying the majority of possession and goal-scoring chances in the opening 45 minutes. The game remained goalless going into half-time, before three goals came in the first five minutes after the break – first, Arthur Dixon put the visitors in front with a header from a corner; the next minute, Charlie Wayman headed in a cross from Eric Day, and a couple of minutes after that Wayman scored a second due to a mistake by goalkeeper Jack Ansell. After leading for just over 10 minutes, the Saints conceded an equaliser through Gwyn Hughes as the result of another corner, before in the 80th minute a third goal from a corner came courtesy of Maurice Candlin.

Additional friendlies
Southampton played one friendly during the 1949–50 season, beating Third Division South side Torquay United 1–0 on 28 January 1950, the only goal scored by reserves player Reginald Dare. Shortly after the conclusion of the league campaign, the team went on a Scandinavian tour which included five exhibition matches. The first, against Danish side Aalborg, ended in a 6–2 win for the travelling Saints, with Charlie Wayman scoring four goals and Ted Bates and Eric Day each scoring one. The victory was followed by a 2–1 loss at Helsingborgs, a 1–1 draw with side Copenhagen, a 1–0 win over Aarhus, and a 2–2 draw with Esbjerg.

Squad statistics

Most appearances

Top goalscorers

Transfers

Footnotes

References

Bibliography

Southampton F.C. seasons
Southampton